later  (born 31 March 1962), is a retired Japanese badminton player. After working at Shijonawate Junior College, Kitada played for Sanyo Electric Ltd. and won a bronze medal in the women's singles exhibition event at the 1988 Seoul Olympics. She is the eight-time Japanese national champion and doubles runner-up four times. She also finished third in the 1986 World Badminton Grand Prix Finals. In 2005, she was appointed as a member of the Nippon Badminton Association Strengthening Committee, and after serving as the head of the strengthening headquarters, she was appointed as the head of the national strengthening department in June 2015.

Achievements

Olympic Games (exhibition)

Asian Games

IBF World Grand Prix 
The World Badminton Grand Prix sanctioned by International Badminton Federation (IBF) from 1983 to 2006.

International tournaments

IBF International

References

External links 

1962 births
Living people
Japanese female badminton players
Asian Games medalists in badminton
Asian Games competitors for Japan
Badminton players at the 1982 Asian Games
Badminton players at the 1986 Asian Games
Asian Games silver medalists for Japan
Asian Games bronze medalists for Japan
Medalists at the 1982 Asian Games
Medalists at the 1986 Asian Games
Badminton players at the 1988 Summer Olympics